Baxter County is a county in the U.S. state of Arkansas. As of the 2020 census, the county's population was 41,627. The county seat is Mountain Home. It is Arkansas's 66th county, formed on March 24, 1873, and named for Elisha Baxter, the tenth governor of Arkansas.

The Mountain Home, AR, Micropolitan Statistical Area includes all of Baxter County. It is in the northern part of the state, bordering Missouri. It is commonly referred to as the Twin Lakes Area because it is bordered by two of Arkansas' largest lakes, Bull Shoals Lake and Norfork Lake. On its southern border is the White River, Norfork Tailwater and the Buffalo National River.

Mountain Home, a small town whose origins date back to the early 19th century, is located in north-central Arkansas on a plateau in the Ozark Mountains. The natural environment of nearby Norfork and Bull Shoals lakes and the surrounding countryside has attracted tourists from around the country for many years. Educational institutions have also played a role in the life of the community.

History
Baxter County was created by the 19th Arkansas General Assembly on March 24, 1873 from parts of Fulton, Izard, Marion, and Searcy counties. It was named for Elisha Baxter, who was governor of Arkansas at the time. The small community of Mountain Home was named temporary county seat; and was later named permanent county seat.

Geography

Baxter County is located within the Salem Plateau, a subregion of the Ozark Mountains. Land near Bull Shoals Lake, Norfork Lake, and along the White River are within the White River Hills subregion, known for steep, rocky soils, spring-fed mountain streams, and oak-hickory-pine forest. Eastern Baxter County and a small area around Mountain Home are within the Central Plateau subregion, known for comparatively flatter terrain more suited for hayfields, pastures, and housing, as well as karst.

Baxter County is surrounded by sparsely populated Ozark counties on all sides: Fulton County to the east, Izard County to the southeast, Stone County to the south, Searcy County to the southwest, Marion County to the west, and Ozark County, Missouri to the north.

Hydrology

Baxter County is within the White River watershed. The river has several important milestones in Baxter County: beginning along the western boundary of Baxter County, the White River is impounded to form the Bull Shoals Lake reservoir by Bull Shoals Dam, which spans the Baxter-Marion county line. South of the dam, the White River forms the western boundary of Baxter-Marion county line until Buffalo City, when the Buffalo National River empties into the White, with the White continuing across Baxter County from west to east. South of Salesville, the North Fork of White River empties into the White via the Norfork Tailwater downstream of Norfork Dam. Within the county, Barren Fork, Big Creek, Bruce Creek, Hightower Creek, Leatherwood Creek, and Moccasin Creek are important watercourses.

Protected areas
Baxter County contains a small section of the Buffalo National River near Buffalo City where the river empties into the White River. Almost all land in Baxter County south of the White River is part of the Ozark National Forest. Within this area, a subdivision of the Ozark National Forest known as the Leatherwood Wilderness is located along Highway 341 (Push Mountain Road). Another part of the Ozark National Forest is also protected in the Sylamore Wildlife Management Area (WMA). The WMA is known as a destination for hiking, fishing, and hunting wild turkey, bear, squirrel, and deer. Camping is available at Blanchard Springs Caverns, Gunner Pool, and Barkshed areas and a gun range is open to the public. The Ozark Highlands Trail passes through the Leatherwood Wilderness and Sylamore WMA.

The Bull Shoals-White River State Park is along the downstream shoreline of Bull Shoals Lake at the Bull Shoals Dam. The park contains campgrounds, a marina, and visitor center. The dam tailwater is well known for trout fishing. 

Norfork Lake WMA is a series of protected walk-in hunting areas along Lake Norfork covered in hardwood forest with some pine and ranging topography. The four Baxter County units are Indian Head Unit, Chapin Point Unit, Seward Point Unit, and the Bennett's Creek Unit. The WMA is managed for deer, turkey and small game and attracts waterfowl during migration.

Demographics

2020 census

As of the 2020 United States census, there were 41,627 people, 18,435 households, and 11,964 families residing in the county.

2000 census
As of the 2000 census, there were 38,386 people, 17,052 households, and 11,799 families residing in the county.  The population density was 69 people per square mile (27/km2).  There were 19,891 housing units at an average density of 36 per square mile (14/km2).  The racial makeup of the county was 97.81% White, 0.11% Black or African American, 0.52% Native American, 0.34% Asian, 0.02% Pacific Islander, 0.22% from other races, and 0.97% from two or more races.  1.00% of the population were Hispanic or Latino of any race.

There were 17,052 households, out of which 22.00% had children under the age of 18 living with them, 59.00% were married couples living together, 7.70% had a female householder with no husband present, and 30.80% were non-families. 27.50% of all households were made up of individuals, and 15.10% had someone living alone who was 65 years of age or older.  The average household size was 2.21 and the average family size was 2.65.

In the county, the population was spread out, with 19.00% under the age of 18, 5.80% from 18 to 24, 21.10% from 25 to 44, 27.40% from 45 to 64, and 26.80% who were 65 years of age or older.  The median age was 48 years. For every 100 females there were 92.30 males.  For every 100 females age 18 and over, there were 89.10 males.

The median income for a household in the county was $29,106, and the median income for a family was $34,578. Males had a median income of $25,976 versus $18,923 for females. The per capita income for the county was $16,859.  About 7.90% of families and 11.10% of the population were below the poverty line, including 14.70% of those under age 18 and 8.90% of those age 65 or over.

As of 2010 Baxter County had a population of 41,513.  The racial makeup was 95.96% Non-Hispanic whites, 0.16% blacks, 0.56% Native Americans, 0.41% Asians, 0.04% Pacific Islanders, 1.25% Non-Hispanics reporting more than one race and 1.66% Hispanic or Latino.

Human resources

Education

The 2019 American Community Survey found 88.7% of Baxter County residents over age 25 held a high school degree or higher and 17.9% holding a bachelor's degree or higher. Baxter County exceeded statewide and nationwide averages for high school attainment (86.6% and 88.0%, respectively), but lags far behind on bachelor's degree attainment (23.0% and 32.1%, respectively).

Primary and secondary education

Three public school districts are based in Baxter County; Mountain Home School District is the largest school district in Baxter County, with Cotter School District serving the Cotter-Gassville area and the Norfork School District serving the southeast side of the county. Successful completion of the curriculum of these schools leads to graduation from Mountain Home High School, Cotter High School, or Norfork High School respectively. All three high schools are accredited by the Arkansas Department of Education (ADE). Small areas in Baxter County are served by the Viola School District and Calico Rock School District.

Higher education
The lone institution of higher education in Baxter County is Arkansas State University-Mountain Home (ASUMH), a public community college. Other nearby institutions include Ozarka College in Melbourne and North Arkansas College in Harrison.

Libraries
The Donald W. Reynolds Library serving Baxter County was opened in September 2010 at 300 Library Hill in Mountain Home. The library offers books, e-books, media, reference, programs, youth, special collections, and genealogy services.

Public health
Baxter Health in Mountain Home offers acute inpatient care, emergency care, diagnostics, surgery, OB/GYN, rehabilitation, therapy, and senior care services. The facility is rated as a Level 3 Trauma Center by the Arkansas Department of Health.

The nearest Level 1 Trauma Centers are CoxHealth and Mercy Hospital Springfield, both in Springfield, Missouri.

Public safety
The Baxter County Sheriff's Office is the primary law enforcement agency in the county. The agency is led by the Baxter County Sheriff, an official elected by countywide vote every four years. Police departments in Cotter, Gassville, Lakeview, and Mountain Home provide law enforcement in their respective jurisdictions, with remaining municipalities contracting with the Baxter County Sheriff's Office for law enforcement services.

The county is under the jurisdiction of the Baxter County District Court, a state district court. State district courts in Arkansas are courts of original jurisdiction for criminal, civil, and traffic matters. State district courts are presided over by an elected full-time judge. The district court has seven departments, one in each municipality of Baxter County.

Superseding district court jurisdiction is the 14th Judicial Circuit Court, which covers Baxter, Boone, Marion, and Newton counties. The 10th Circuit contains four circuit judges, elected to six-year terms circuitwide.

Fire protection is provided by nineteen agencies in Baxter County, together covering the entire county except areas within the major lakes. Cotter, Gassville, Norfork, and Mountain Home, each provide fire protection, in some cases extending beyond corporate limits. Rural areas are served by the Buford Volunteer, Clarkridge Volunteer, Cotter-Gassville Rural, Gamaliel, Grover Township, Hand Cove Fire Protection District, Henderson, Lone Rock Volunteer, Midway Volunteer, Northeast Lakeside, Oakland-Promise Land Volunteer, Rodney Volunteer, Salesville, Tracy Area, and the United States Forest Service.

Culture and contemporary life

Baxter County has several facilities, monuments, and museums dedicated to preserving the history and culture of the area. Perhaps one of the most recognizable and important historic structures in Baxter County is the Cotter Bridge over the White River. Upon opening in 1930, the bridge opened Baxter County and north Arkansas to economic development and tourism by providing reliable transportation across the White River.

Two facilities interpret the county's history and heritage: the Jacob Wolf House, a historic log cabin built in 1825, is operated as a historic house museum by the Arkansas Department of Parks, Heritage, and Tourism, and the Baxter County Heritage Center, located in the former Rollins Hospital in downtown Gassville. Five National Register of Historic Places (NRHP, complete county list) properties in the county relate to the history of education: Buford School Building, Cold Water School, and the Horace Mann School Historic District, as well as Big Flat School Gymnasium, Old Cotter High School Gymnasium. Several buildings are preserved for connections to the county's economic and cultural history: Baxter County Courthouse, the Sid Hutcheson Building in Norfork, and several structures in the Mountain Home Commercial Historic District.

Media

The county newspaper is the The Baxter Bulletin, a daily newspaper established in Mountain Home in 1901.

Government and politics

The county government is a constitutional body granted specific powers by the Constitution of Arkansas and the Arkansas Code. The quorum court is the legislative branch of the county government and controls all spending and revenue collection. Representatives are called justices of the peace and are elected from county districts every even-numbered year. The number of districts in a county vary from nine to fifteen based on population, and district boundaries are drawn by the Baxter County Election Commission. The Baxter County Quorum Court has eleven members. Presiding over quorum court meetings is the county judge, who serves as the chief operating officer of the county. The county judge is elected at-large and does not vote in quorum court business, although capable of vetoing quorum court decisions.

Communities

Cities
 Briarcliff
 Cotter
 Gassville
 Lakeview
 Mountain Home (county seat)
 Norfork
 Salesville

Town
 Big Flat (partly in Searcy County)

Census designated places
 Buffalo City
 Gamaliel
 Henderson
 Midway

Other unincorporated communities
 Buford
 Clarkridge
Jordan/Rodney, Ark
 Braircliff, Arkansas-Baxter

Townships

Infrastructure

Major highways

 US 62
 US 412
 U.S. Route 62 Business
 Arkansas Highway 5
 Arkansas Highway 14
 Arkansas Highway 101
 Arkansas Highway 126
 Arkansas Highway 177
 Arkansas Highway 178
 Arkansas Highway 201
 Arkansas Highway 202
 Arkansas Highway 201 Spur
 Arkansas Highway 263
 Arkansas Highway 341
 Arkansas Highway 342
 Arkansas Highway 345

Notable residents

 Richard Antrim, naval rear admiral, World War II veteran and Medal of Honor recipient
 Lonnie D. Bentley,  professor and the head of the Department of Computer and Information Technology at Purdue University
 Robbie Branscum, writer of children's books and young adult fiction
 Johnny R. Key, member of the Arkansas Senate from Baxter County and former  Arkansas Secretary of Education
 Richard A. Knaak – author of Minotaur Wars and other contributions to Dragonlance
 William U. McCabe, represented Baxter County in the Arkansas Senate from 1921 to 1924, and in the Arkansas House of Representatives in 1931 until his death
 Vada Sheid, longtime member of the Arkansas General Assembly representing Baxter County
 Carolyn D. Wright – poet, born in Mountain Home

See also
 National Register of Historic Places listings in Baxter County, Arkansas

Notes

References

Further reading

External links
 Baxter County government's website
 
 Ozark Amateur Radio Club - website

 
1873 establishments in Arkansas
Populated places established in 1873